The International Chamber Music Competition Hamburg (ICMC Hamburg) has been held in Hamburg, Germany since September 2009. The competition takes place every three years and is for performers of two types of chamber music, String Quartet and Piano Trio.

Director of the International Chamber Music Competition Hamburg is Prof. Niklas Schmidt who is teaching cello at the Hochschule für Musik und Theater Hamburg and was one of the founders of the former Trio Fontenay. Project leader of the competition is the cultural manager Jan Wulf.

Venues
Rolf-Liebermann-Studio des Norddeutschen Rundfunks (NDR)
Forum der Hochschule für Musik und Theater Hamburg
Mozartsaal im Logenhaus Hamburg

References

External links

The official website of the International Chamber Music Competition Hamburg

German music awards